Rainbow Magic is a British children's fiction brand originally created by Working Partners and now owned by IoM Media Ventures. It is best known for the children's books published by Orchard Books. The books are ghostwritten by a number of authors under the collective pseudonym Daisy Meadows, and illustrated by Georgie Ripper and Alison Winfield in several books and uncredited illustrators in the latest books. The series follows the lives of Kirsty Tate, Rachel Walker, Gracie Adebayo and Khadijah Khan and their magical adventures with their fairy friends.

Rainbow Magic books by Daisy Meadows were the most-borrowed children's books at libraries in the United Kingdom, and the second-most borrowed books overall at those libraries, in 2010 and 2011, respectively.

The Rainbow Magic books are issued by Scholastic Inc. in the United States. Some series and individual book titles vary in the Scholastic editions. There are also colored Rainbow Magic books for younger readers, which are also published by Scholastic.

The books are usually six chapters long, and tell one overarching story spanning out over seven books. Each set of books is based on a theme, such as 'The Sporty Fairies' and 'The Jewel Fairies.’

Characters
Main characters

 Rachel Walker
 Kirsty Tate
 Gracie Adebayo
 Khadijah Khan
 Jack Frost, king of the goblins
 Mr. Walker, Rachel Walker's father
 Mrs. Walker, Rachel Walker's mother
 Mr. Tate, Kirsty Tate's father
 Mrs. Tate, Kirsty Tate's mother
 Mum, Gracie Adebayo's 1st mother
 Mama, Gracie Adebayo's 2nd mother
 Mr. Khan, Khadijah Khan's father
 Mrs. Khan, Khadijah Khan's mother
 Rafi, Khadijah Khan's brother
 Queen Titania, queen of the fairies
 King Oberon, king of the fairies
 Betram, frog footman

Authors
The Rainbow Magic books are written and illustrated by a number of authors and illustrators:

 Linda Chapman
 Narinder Dhami
 Rachel Elliot
 Sue Bentley
 Sue Mongredien
 Sarah Levison
 Marilyn Kaye
 Kristen Earhart
 Mandy Archer
 Tracey West
 Alison Winfield 

Each title carries a dedication including a "special thanks" indicating the primary author.

Books

Rainbow Magic: Return to Rainspell Island

Rainbow Magic: Return to Rainspell Island is a straight to video anime movie that was first released in the United Kingdom on 7 May 2010. It is a British-Japanese co-production that was co-produced by HIT Entertainment and The Answer Studio. It was also released in Japan; the film was only recorded in English as its Japanese release has no Japanese vocal track.

References

External links
 Rainbow Magic official website
 Rainbow Magic Series Homepage at Hachette Children's
 Rainbow Magic on Hit Entertainment website
 

Book series introduced in 2003
Children's fiction books
Series of children's books
British children's books
Orchard Books books